Sultan Mohammed Imaduddin I (1580–1648) was the Sultan of Maldives from 11 December 1628 to 1648. He was the son of Umar Maafai Kilage and Mariyam Kabaidhi Kilage. After ruling for 20 years, the sultan died at the age of 68 and was buried in the Koilu Mosque.

Name: Sultan Mohamed Imaduddin (1st)
Koli Name: Siri Kula Sundar Kadhura Khomeini 2nd Maharadhun
Other names: Great King, Kalhutukkalaa
Descendants of Utheemu: Utheemu's descendants
Father: Umar Maamah Kile
Mother: Amina Maava Kilege
Members: Sultan Ibrahim Iskandhar or King Iskandhar
Reigned: 1,029h - 1,058h (1620 - 1648) Period: 29 years

1580 births
1648 deaths
17th-century sultans of the Maldives

Origin 
Sultan Mohamed Imaduddin (1st) is the son of Utheemu Ali Thakurufaanu. The deceased is the son of Amina Kabadi Kile, who was married to Mariyam Kandi Kile of Utheemu Ali Thakurufaanu or Ali Khatib Thakurufaanu. His father is Umar Maamah Kile of Madifushi, Th.

Becoming Sultan 
Kalhu Tukkala, who was taken from Malabar after Sultan Ibrahim (3rd) Shaheed, was taken from The Maldives. He heard about the passing away of Sultan Hussain Famuladerekile while in Kanannoor.

During the reign 
Sultan Mohamed Imaduddin (1st) has been married to His Excellency Aisha. The king's call was badly damaged when he ascended to the throne. His top priority was to rebuild the call of the devastated kingdom. He surrounded the coal and built the wall's premises into a fireplace. And what happened outside the wall.

War with Portuguese 
After Sultan Mohamed Imaduddin (1st) was crowned Sultan in the fifth year of his reign, a group of Portuguese nationals came to Male' city with weapons. Before the war against the Portuguese people began his reign was going very strong. His biggest priority was to bring together ministers and soldiers and make everyone pledge not to turn their backs on the battlefield.

A total of five guns were brought by Portuguese people to Male'. The war between The Maldives and Portugal had begun and Maldivians won the war. The Portuguese people, who were defeated in the war, burned down Villingili Mosque when they returned. The war took place in Hijra in 1034.

Peace 
The king did not delay taking the necessary measures from his experience. A large court in connection was created with the king's call. He set off the doors of the parade. Similarly, he created a parade across Male' city and opened the door to the parades. A wall was placed between each of the two rounds. The door was also cut off. According to the police, the island has been surrounded by people after protecting the islands. The establishments of the island have been cut off from the premises so that they can leave the audits.

After the establishment of Male' city as the king of the kingdom, Raadhun's vision was to be influenced in other directions. In other areas of defense. He first sent a boat to Asekara to inspect the big gun. Ali Malimi of Kuburudhoo was sent as the intention of the Audi. The audit was conducted with 14 guns from Rathlo Gun. After that, the Maldives received a lot of votes from the boats of the Kaafaru.

Conflict with Samiyakilege 
He had worked to reclaim the reign of Samiya Kilege more than once during the reign of Sultan Mohamed Imaduddin (1st). Samiya Kilege is the sister of Aisha. Samiya Kilege is the king of Maafilaafushi. King's army had to be sent to Maafilaafushi to seize Samiya Kilege on several occasions. The King of Maafilaafushi recently departed to Malé. He was arrested in Male' City while he was in Male' and brought to Male' with a silver stone. Samiya Kilege died while being deported to Fuvahmulah City. After Samiya Kilege's death, the power of the country was even stronger.

Legacy 
Sultan Mohamed Imaduddin (1st) is a wise king of the Quran. Peace was spread among Maldivians. He was a king who carried the Quran and beauty of the Maldives while the situation in the country was weak. However, he said he was very angry.

Death 
Sultan Mohamed Imaduddin (1st) died on 5 Shawwal 1058 AH. He ruled for 29 years.